Springfield Corners is an unincorporated community located in the town of Springfield, Dane County, Wisconsin, United States, at the intersection of County Highway P and US Highway 12. The town hall for the Town of Springfield is located in the community, along with a park, several businesses, several neighborhoods, and a small business park.

Notes

Unincorporated communities in Dane County, Wisconsin
Unincorporated communities in Wisconsin